Ivar's is a seafood restaurant chain based in Seattle, Washington, United States, with operations in the Puget Sound region and in Spokane, Washington.

Ivar's also owns the Seattle-based burger restaurant chain Kidd Valley.

History
Ivar's was founded in 1938 by Seattle folk singer Ivar Haglund. Having built Seattle's first aquarium on what is now Pier 54, he decided to add a companion fish and chips bar to feed his visitors. The bar was short-lived, however. On July 22, 1946, Haglund opened a new restaurant, Ivar's Acres of Clams, at the same location. The aquarium closed ten years later, but the restaurant remains.

Ivar's has two other full-service restaurants: Ivar's Salmon House in Seattle's Northlake neighborhood, and Ivar's Mukilteo Landing in Mukilteo, Washington, next to the Washington State Ferries terminal. There is a fishbar outside of all three full-service restaurants.  All its other locations are seafood bars.  Ivar's created the famous saying of "keep clam" that is posted all over each of the eateries.

Nard Jones remarked in 1972 that Haglund was "not afraid to reflect Puget Sound tradition in the decor of his restaurants, whereas others of his profession seem intent on making their patrons forget where they are." In this respect, he singled out the Salmon House, "an almost exact replica of an old Indian longhouse."

Every Independence Day from 1964 until 2008, Ivar's sponsored the Fourth of Jul-Ivar's festival and fireworks show at Downtown Seattle's Myrtle Edwards Park on Elliott Bay. Ivar's estimated its attendance at around 300,000 people. On April 3, 2009, Ivar's announced it was no longer sponsoring its Fourth of Jul-Ivar's community fireworks show.  Ivar's decided to focus its efforts on feeding families in the Pacific Northwest through its partnership with Northwest Harvest.

Underwater billboard hoax
Capitalizing on founder Haglund's reputation for eccentric marketing stunts, Ivar's put out a story that Haglund had placed billboards on the bottom of the Sound, related to a proposal he had once made for submarine traffic as a viable mode of transportation. Some documentation was released, including maps of possible sub-aquatic billboard locations. On August 22, 2009 one of the rumored signs was discovered and hoisted out of the water, advertising a cup of Clam Chowder for $0.75. Several other signs followed. The signs were displayed publicly as authentic, with Ivar's saying that for a time they would honor the $0.75 price for chowder.

All of this turned out to be a hoax. The signs were sunk earlier in 2009, and local historian Paul Dorpat had deliberately furthered the hoax. Dorpat, of HistoryLink contributes a weekly column to the Seattle Times, and attempted to hoax that newspaper, whose first story about the billboards cast doubt on their authenticity, stating, "if it was a hoax, a prime suspect would be the Ivar's chain itself." Several minor clues were placed to guarantee that the hoax would eventually unravel. For example, the chowder price wasn't correct for the ostensible date, and the wrong governor's name was on the letterhead from the Department of Fisheries.

Recall
In 2021, Kettle Classic Clam Chowder with Uncured Bacon, sold only at Costco, was recalled in 13 states for plastic in the Chowder.

See also
Fried clams
Ivar Feeding the Gulls (1988)
Rally fries
 List of seafood restaurants

Notes

External links
Ivar's
Kidd Valley

1938 establishments in Washington (state)
Fast-food chains of the United States
Fast-food seafood restaurants
Regional restaurant chains in the United States
Restaurants established in 1938
Restaurants in Seattle
Seafood restaurants in the United States